Wangjingdong station is a station on Line 15 of the Beijing Subway, situated between  and . It opened on December 31, 2016.

Station layout 
The station has an underground island platform.

Exits 
There are 3 exits, lettered B, C, and D. Exit B is accessible.

References

External links

Beijing Subway stations in Chaoyang District